Wer wird Millionär? is a German game show based on the original British format of Who Wants to Be a Millionaire?. It is hosted by Günther Jauch. The show has been broadcast from 3 September 1999 until today. It is shown on the German TV station RTL on Mondays and Fridays at 20:15 (UTC+1).

The main goal of the show is to win €1 million (previously 1 million DM) by answering 15 multiple-choice questions correctly. If contestants get the fifth question correct, they will leave with at least €500. If they get the tenth question correct, they will leave with at least €16,000, unless they enabled the fourth 'lifeline' (added in 2007).

Wer wird Millionär? payout structure

Fourth lifeline ('ask one of the audience')
Since 2007, there has been a fourth lifeline, called Zusatzjoker ("additional lifeline"). It can be added to the three normal lifelines "Ask the Audience" ("Publikumsjoker"), "Fifty-fifty" ("Fünfzig-fünfzig-Joker") and "Phone a Friend" ("Telefonjoker"). When using this lifeline, members of the audience who think to know the answer can stand up and one of them can talk to the contestant after being chosen by them. If the member of the audience gives the right answer, they will win €500. The contestant can follow the chosen person but they don't have to. If the contestant walks away and does not trust the chosen person but the answer is right, the chosen person will nevertheless win €500 because they got the correct answer. The contestant can add this lifeline before the game starts, however if one does so, there will be no guaranteed prize sum of €16,000 upon getting the 10th question correctly.
If a contestant chooses the fourth lifeline, they can also phone a person in Germany selected at random (extended phone-a-friend lifeline). The contestant can say the gender, age and the town of the person which shall be called. Then RTL calls to see if the person picks up (after 30 seconds the phone call will be interrupted.) If the person picks up but does not want to help or cannot help, the phone-a-friend lifeline is considered to be played and is not usable anymore. If the phoned person answers correctly, they will get €500. But the extended phone-a-friend lifeline is only usable with the fourth lifeline. It is an alternative to the normal phone-a-friend lifeline. If a contestant has used the extended phone-a-friend lifeline, they are not allowed to call one of his previously three selected friends.

Top-prize winners
These are the questions with which people have won the biggest prize.

 Eckhard Freise (2 December 2000)

 Marlene Grabherr (20 May 2001)

Marlene Grabherr died in 2013 at the age of 60.

 Gerhard Krammer (18 October 2002)

 Dr. Maria Wienströer (29 March 2004)

 Stefan Lang (9 October 2006)

 Timur Hahn (8 January 2007) – With the help of his brother as a phoned friend

 Oliver Pocher (30 May 2008) (celebrity version) – With the help of 'Ask the Audience'

 Thomas Gottschalk (20 November 2008) (celebrity version) – With the help of Marcel-Reich Ranicki as a phoned friend

 Ralf Schnoor (26 November 2010) – He phoned a friend but he did not need his help. He told him he would win the million euros. His behaviour was similar to John Carpenter's, the first ever million winner of the entire franchise.

 Barbara Schöneberger (30 May 2011) (celebrity edition) – With the help of Pankraz Freiherr von Freyberg as a phoned friend.

 Sebastian Langrock (11 March 2013)

 Thorsten Fischer (17 October 2014) (15th anniversary) – You could go to the million euro question after reaching question 10 and jump to the €1 Million question. But if you chose this, you could not walk away. Answering incorrectly meant you dropped back to €500. Fischer chose to hear the €1 Million question after reaching question 10 and answered correctly.  

 Nadja Sidikjar (13 November 2015) (2nd Jackpot special) – In the jackpot special the total number of money increases, with every players' winning total being added to the prize pool. One contestant wins the entire amount; the rest of them go home empty handed. In the 2nd jackpot special there was a head-to-head between two candidates. The first contestant to answer three questions correctly scooped the total prize. Nadja Sidikjar's last question was:

 Leon Windscheid (7 December 2015)

 Jan Stroh (2 September 2019) (20th anniversary) – Every question Stroh had to answer had already been asked in the past 20 years of the show. He also received four lifelines (Phone A Friend being replaced with a second Ask one of the Audience) and the guaranteed level at €16,000 which is usually disabled when contestants choose the additional Ask one of the Audience.    

 Ronald Tenholte (24 March 2020)

Top-prize losers

 Georges Devalois Yepnang Mouhoutou (17 October 2014) (15th anniversary) – Mouhoutou is currently the only contestant in the German version of the Millionaire franchise who answered the final question incorrectly. He also chose to go for the million after reaching question 10. As he chose to play with all four lifelines and had to answer, he dropped from €1,000,000 to €500. He answered a, but the correct answer is b.

Notes

References

External links

Who Wants to Be a Millionaire?
German game shows
RTL (German TV channel) original programming
1999 German television series debuts
2000s German television series
2010s German television series
German-language television shows